The Minegumo-class destroyer is a destroyer class of the Japanese Maritime Self-Defense Force, the successor of the .

This class derived from its predecessor  to be fitted with the QH-50D DASH, the new anti-submarine drone helicopter in return for the removal of the ASROC system. And similarly, it mainly tasked with Anti-submarine warfare. In 1969, after the production of the QH-50D ceased, this class was no longer built and construction of the Yamagumo-class resumed.

The JMSDF considered refitting Light Airborne Multi-Purpose System Mk.1 with the Kaman SH-2 Seasprite helicopter in return for the facility of DASH, but this plan was abandoned because of the problem of cost. Finally, the facility of DASH was removed in 1979-82, and Mk.16 GMLS for the ASROC system was fitted.

Murakumo was refitted in 1978 for use as a gun trials ship. Rear Mk.33 gun was removed and a new OTO Melara 76 mm gun was added.

Names

References 

The Maru Special, Ships of the JMSDF No.58 "Escort ship Yamagumo-class and Minegumo-class", Ushio Shobō (Japan), December 1981

 

Destroyer classes